Rumfa College is a High school located in the Northern part of Nigeria in Kano State, Founded in 1927 as a Kano Middle School then changed to Kano Province School, it later was renamed to Government College Kano, and is now named Rumfa College, Kano. The name Rumfa came from the name of Muhammad Rumfa.

Rumfa College is one of the largest boarding school in Northern Nigeria and now is no longer a boarding school. The school is known for the large number of elites from the region who attended, among its alumni include General Sani Abacha and General Murtala Mohammed who were former Presidents of Nigeria, Dr Ado Bayero the Emir of Kano State, Governor of Jigawa State Mohammed Badaru Abubakar, Former Governor of Bauchi State Mohammed Abdullahi Abubakar, former Chairman Unity Bank plc Nu'uman Barau Danbatta.

Notable alumni

Notable alumni of Rumfa include:

 Murtala Mohammed President of Nigeria
 Sani Abacha - President of Nigeria
 Ado Bayero - Emir of Kano
 Mohammed Badaru Abubakar - Governor of Jigawa State
 Mohammed Abdullahi Abubakar - Former Governor Bauchi State
 Nu'uman Barau Danbatta - Former Chairman Unity Bank plc

References

Secondary schools in Nigeria
Government schools in Nigeria
Schools in Kano State
1927 establishments in Nigeria
Educational institutions established in 1927
Universities and colleges in Kano State
Education in Kano
Buildings and structures in Kano
Neo-Sudanic architecture